Aalaap  is a 2012 musical drama film and the first film directed by Manish Manikpuri. The film is set and shot in and around present day Chhattisgarh with the main protagonists being college students with a passion for music.

Cast
 Amit Purohit as Rahul
 Pitobash Tripathy as Subhash
 Sunil Tiwari
 Harsh Rajput as Prashant 
 Aabid Shamim as Brajesh 
 Ruhi Chaturvedi
 Rituparna Sengupta as Bharti 
 Omkar Das Manikpuri
 Raghubir Yadav
 Vijay Raaz as Bachchi bhaiyya
 Abhimanyu Singh
 Murli Sharma as  Anna Reddy
 Aashish Patil
 Mohan Sagar
 Gamya Wijayadasa as item number "Chadhti Jawani"
 Kamesh Rao

Production

Development
Aalaap is a Bollywood film produced under the banner of Shri Shankaracharya Arts Pvt. Ltd., Mumbai. The film which is based on youth and music has the potential to spread youth awareness across all corners of the nation. It has been jointly produced by renowned educationalists of Chhattisgarh Mr. Nishant Tripathi and Late Mr. Abhishek Mishra from SSCET group.

Casting
Raghubir Yadav, Ruhi Chaturvedi Vijay Raaz, Rrishna Srivastava and Onkar Das Manikpuri were roped in initially. Manish Manikpuri cites that "casting is one of the film's strengths". Amit Purohit, Pitobash Tripathy, Harsh Rajput and Aabid Shamim, Mohan lal sagar play the lead roles. Miss Sri Lanka 2009, Gamya Wijayadasa is making her Bollywood debut with an item song called "Chadti Jawaani Mazedaar".

Filming
Aalaap has got a specific significance as it portrays the youth in the background of Chhattisgarh. It has been produced and directed by the people of Chhattisgarh's origin and major part of the shooting has been done in the Chhattisgarh state itself.

Soundtrack
The music director of this film is Agnee with lyrics from Panchhi Jalonvi, K Mohan, Shailendra Singh Sodhi and Nawaldas Manikpuri. The first look of the song "Pa Paraa Paa" from the film has been revealed in a promo. Guitars and programming on all songs by Koco, additional Acoustic Guitar parts on all songs by K Mohan and bass Guitar on all songs by Among Jamir.
All Songs mixed at YRF Studios by Shantanu Hudiker and Abhishek Khandelwal. All recordings at Nishaad, the Agnee Studio except Vocal recordings at YRF Studios & Audio Garage Studio.

See also 
 Bollywood films of 2012
 Directorial debut films

References

External links
 
 We're all various shades of grey Amit Purohit & Harsh Rajput speak about their role in Aalaap Sakaal Times
 Ritu's me-time Rituparna Sengupta interview with The Telegraph (Calcutta)
 Agnee's Mohan Agnee – The Band interview with RadioAndMusic
 Agnee To Score Bollywood Film Agnee – with NH7 Weekender Team
 Agnee: A Look back Agnee – with Amanda Sodhi
 Aalaap: hear the Music
 Aalaap BLOG

2012 films
2010s Hindi-language films
Indian musical drama films
2010s musical drama films
2012 directorial debut films
2012 drama films
Hindi-language drama films